Rosita Forbes, née Joan Rosita Torr, (16 January 1890 – 30 June 1967) was an English travel writer, novelist and explorer. In 1920–1921 she was the first European woman to visit the Kufra Oasis in Libya (together with the Egyptian explorer Ahmed Hassanein), in a period when this was closed to Westerners.

Early life
Joan Rosita Torr was born at Riseholme Hall, near Lincoln, England, the eldest child of Herbert James Torr, a landowner, and Rosita Graham Torr. Her father was a Member of Parliament.

Career
During the First World War she drove an ambulance in France for two years. From 1917 to 1918, she travelled in Asia with another unhappy military wife, Armorel Meinertzhagen, visiting 30 countries. After the war, she and Meinertzhagen travelled in North Africa, "with little money but much ingenuity." The result was her first book, Unconducted Wanderers (1919). The next year, she disguised herself as an Arab woman named "Sitt Khadija" to visit the Kufra Oasis in 1921, the first European woman (and only the second European) known to have seen that location. The way she portrayed the expedition's organiser, Ahmed Hassanein, as a minor part of the journey was criticized by her book's reviewers and his colleagues, who pointed out that he was an Oxford-educated diplomat.

In 1937, Forbes was the second Westerner and first Western woman to visit places from Sahara to Samarkand, which is today are in Libya to Uzbekistan. She had a gift of a genuine traveller; she lived and mixed with the locals, made friends with the Afghans, Indians, Tajiks, Uzbeks, Kazaks and Afghans and bonded well with the natives although she was, most of the time, the only woman during the journey. The journey is described in her travelogue called The Sahara to Samarkand. 
	
Rosita Forbes found an audience as a daring and witty travel writer and lecturer between the wars, and as a novelist; but her reputation was further tarnished in the 1930s by her description of walking through a flower garden with Adolf Hitler, and her meetings with Benito Mussolini. She published a book of interviews in 1940, These Men I Knew, insisting that she was only reporting their politics, not endorsing them; she also lectured in support of the British war effort in Canada and the United States. Soon, the McGraths went to live in the Bahamas to avoid further controversy.

Forbes was made a fellow of the Royal Geographical Society, and received medals from the Royal Antwerp Geographical Society and the French Geographical Society, and an award in 1924 from the Royal Society of Arts. She also made an early travel film, From Red Sea to Blue Nile, and two of her novels became silent films (Fighting Love (1927) and The White Sheik (1928), based on her novels If the Gods Laugh and King's Mate, respectively). Her 1924 biography, The Sultan of the Mountains: The Life Story of Raisuli, was loosely adapted for the screen in 1972 by John Milius as The Wind and the Lion.

Personal life
Joan Rosita Torr married Col. Robert Foster Forbes in 1911. They divorced after she left him in 1917, selling her wedding ring and sailing for South Africa. She was married again in 1921, to Col. Arthur Thomas McGrath. She was widowed in 1962, and she died in 1967, at home in Warwick, Bermuda, aged 77 years.

Works by Rosita Forbes

Non-fiction
Unconducted Wanderers, 1919
The Secret of the Sahara: Kufara, 1921
The Sultan of the Mountains: The Life Story of Raisuli, 1924
From Red Sea to Blue Nile: Abyssinian Adventure, 1925 (also published under the title From Red Sea to Blue Nile: A Thousand Miles of Ethiopia?)
Adventure, 1928
Conflict: Angora to Afghanistan, 1931
Eight Republics in Search of a Future: Evolution & Revolution in South America, 1932
Women called Wild, 1935
Forbidden Road--Kabul to Samarkand, 1937 (also published under the title Russian Road to India--By Kabul and Samarkand)
These Are Real People, 1937
A Unicorn in the Bahamas, 1939
India of the Princes, 1939
These Men I Knew, 1940
Gypsy in the Sun, 1944
Appointment with Destiny, 1946
Henry Morgan, Pirate, 1946
Sir Henry Morgan, Pirate & Pioneer, 1948
Islands in the Sun, 1949

Selected novels
 If the Gods Laugh (1925)
 Sirocco (1927)
 King's Mate (1928)
 The Cavaliers of Death (1930)
 The Extraordinary House (1934)
 The Golden Vagabond (1936)

References

External links

The National Portrait Gallery has several images of Rosita Forbes, including one political cartoon.
Margaret Bald, ed., From The Sahara to Samarkand: Selected Travel Writings of Rosita Forbes, 1919-1937 (Axios Press 2010). 

 
Forgotten Travellers: Appointments in the Sun  Essay on Rosita Forbes
Rosita Forbes at the British Film Institute

English travel writers
English women non-fiction writers
British women travel writers
English explorers
Female explorers
Explorers of Africa
Explorers of the Libyan Desert
1890 births
1967 deaths
Royal Canadian Geographical Society fellows